Paul L. Williams (born 1944) is an American author, journalist, and consultant. He was also an adjunct professor of humanities and philosophy at Wilkes University and The University of Scranton.

Career
Williams received a Bachelor of Arts degree in English from Wilkes University, a Master of Divinity degree from Drew University, and a Doctor of Philosophy degree also from Drew. His dissertation, based on Latin texts, was on the moral philosophy of Peter Abelard.

Born and raised a Roman Catholic, Williams is a descendant of a family of Irish coal miners in Scranton, Pennsylvania. He began his career by writing articles on Catholicism for National Review and serving as the senior editor for The Fellowship of Catholic Scholars. His first book, Everything You Always Wanted To Know about the Catholic Church But Were Afraid to Ask for Fear of Excommunication was published by Doubleday in 1989. In The Day of Islam: The Annihilation of America and the Western World, he expands on the "American Hiroshima" scenario he believes to be imminent, in which simultaneous nuclear attacks on 7 to 10 American cities would create havoc in American society. The Vatican Exposed, published in 2003 became the subject of a documentary for the Discovery Channel. "Operation Gladio: The Unholy Alliance between the Vatican, the CIA, and the Mafia," published in 2014, is being developed into a mini-series for American Movie Classics. His most recent work, Among the Ruins: The Decline and Fall of the Roman Catholic Church, was published in 2017.

In Williams' 2006 book Dunces of Doomsday, he claimed that Adnan Shukrijumah, Amer el-Maati, Jaber A. Elbaneh and Anas al-Liby had all been seen around Hamilton, Ontario the previous year, and that Shukrijumah had been seen at McMaster University where he "wasted no time in gaining access to the nuclear reactor and stealing more than 180 pounds of nuclear material for the creation of radiological bombs". He was subsequently sued by the university for libel, with the lawyer representing the university in the case saying that, "Mr. Williams' allegations about McMaster [are] on a par with UFO reports and JFK conspiracy theories...the notion that because there are people on faculty from Egypt that McMaster is then a haven for terrorism is not only logically offensive, it smacks of racism." The publisher later apologized for allowing Williams to print statements which "were without basis in fact"; the Jackman chronology focused on Ahmad Abou El Maati says the FBI in 2003 named his brother Amer el-Maati as a member of a terrorist cell in Canada of which another member, Adnan El Shukrijumah, attempted in 2002 to procure radioactive materials at the McMaster Nuclear Reactor in Hamilton, Ontario. Williams remained defiant saying, "I love them coming after us. At the end of the day these people are going to be bloodied because what I am saying is true. They are not going to walk away from this unscathed because I will proclaim what is going on at McMaster from the rooftops."

Williams is the only journalist to capture three first-place Keystone Press Awards in three different categories in the same year. He has penned articles for major news outlets, including USA Today, The Wall Street Journal, and National Review. He has appeared on Fox News, NPR, and MSNBC, and penned articles concerning Islamic paramilitary compounds that he claims have been established throughout the country. In 2010, he was quoted as saying he had become "a pariah in the publishing world"; however, he remains a popular speaker on the Christian circuit.

Books
Everything You Wanted to know about the Catholic Church - Doubleday Books,   (1989)
The Complete Idiot's Guide to the Crusades, Penguin,  (2001)
The Complete Idiot's Guide to the Lives of the Saints, Penguin,  (2001)
The Life and Work of Mother Teresa, Alpha,  (2001)
Al Qaeda:  Brotherhood of Terror - Alpha Books  (2002)
The Vatican Exposed.  Money, Murder, and the Mafia - Prometheus Books  (2003)
Osama's Revenge:  The Next 9/11:  What the Media and the Government Haven't Told You, Prometheus Books,  (2004)
Al Qaeda Connection:  International Terrorism, Organized Crime, and the Coming Apocalypse, Prometheus Books,  (2005)
Dunces of Doomsday: 10 Blunders that Gave Rise to Radical Islam, Terrorist Regimes, and an American Hiroshima, WND Books,   (2006)
The Day of Islam: The Annihilation of America and the Western World, Prometheus Books,  (5 June 2007)
Operation Gladio: The Unholy Alliance between the Vatican, the CIA, and the Mafia, Prometheus Books,  (2015)

References

American political writers
American male non-fiction writers
American traditionalist Catholics
Traditionalist Catholic writers
Traditionalist Catholic conspiracy theorists
Living people
1944 births
American conspiracy theorists